National Highway 317A, commonly called NH 317A is a national highway in the state of West Bengal in India. It is a branch of National Highway 317. NH 317A is a very important road providing connectivity to Bhutan. This national highway is also part of Asian Highway 48.

Route 
NH317A connects Hasimara and Jaigaon at Bhutan border in the state of West Bengal.

Junctions  

  Terminal near Hasimara.

See also 
 List of National Highways in India by highway number
 List of National Highways in India by state

References 

National highways in India
National Highways in West Bengal